An ester is a functional group in organic chemistry; specifically a chemical compound derived from an acid in which at least one hydroxyl group is replaced by alkoxy group.

Ester may also refer to:

Food additives and chemistry
 Ester C, ascorbyl palmitate, used as an antioxidant food additive
 Ester gum, or Ester of wood rosin, a food additive used as an emulsifier and stabiliser
 Ester pyrolysis, a vacuum pyrolysis reaction

Geography
 Ester, Alaska, a town
 Ester Camp Historic District, Alaska
 Ester Mountains in Germany
 Ester (Castro Daire), parish in Castro Daire, Portugal

People
 Ester, the Italian, Spanish, and Portuguese version of the female given name Esther
 Laura Ester (1990), Spanish female water polo goalkeeper
 Pauline Ester, French singer born Sabrina Ocon in 1963
 Peter Ester (born 1953), Dutch sociologist and politician
 Sofia Ester (born 1978), Portuguese author
 Ester (footballer) (born 1982), Brazilian footballer

Music

Classical
 Ester (Stradella), an Italian oratorio by Alessandro Stradella
 Ester, an Italian oratorio by Carlo Arrigoni Vienna 1737–38
 Ester, an Italian oratorio by Carl Ditters von Dittersdorf 
 Ester, a Hebrew-language oratorio by  C. G. Lidarti

Popular
 Ester, an album by Trailer Trash Tracys 2012

Other uses
 Typhoon Ester (disambiguation)

See also
 Esther (disambiguation)
 Hadassah (disambiguation)

Estonian feminine given names
Portuguese feminine given names
Spanish feminine given names